Zhao Hejing (born 19 May 1985) is a Chinese footballer who plays as full-back for Chinese club Chongqing Tongliangloong.

Club career

Chongqing Lifan F.C. 
Zhao Hejing started his football career with top tier side Chongqing Lifan and would make his league debut for the team on 3 July 2005 against Sichuan Guancheng where he conceded a penalty that led his club losing 2-1. Despite the defeat, Zhao would gradually establish himself as a regular; however, by the end of the 2006 season, he was part of the team that was relegated. He remained faithful towards the team and would be a vital player as the club won promotion back into the top tier at the end of the 2008 season. His return to the top tier often saw the club struggle within the league and Chongqing were once again relegated at the end of the 2010 season.

Dalian Aerbin F.C. 
Before the 2011 season, Zhao would transfer to second tier side Dalian Aerbin for 2 million yuan. At his new club, he would immediately establish himself as a vital member of the team and by the end of the season go on to win the division title and promotion to the top flight.

Beijing Guoan F.C. 
On 3 January 2014, Zhao transferred to fellow Chinese Super League side Beijing Guoan on a free transfer. He made his debut for the club on 15 March 2014 in a 1-0 win against Dalian Aerbin.

Guizhou Hengfeng F.C. 
On 11 December 2017, Zhao transferred to fellow Chinese Super League side Guizhou Hengfeng.

Career statistics
Statistics accurate as of match played 31 December 2020.

Honours

Club
Dalian Aerbin
China League One: 2011

References

External links
Player profile at Sodasoccer.com

1985 births
Living people
Chinese footballers
Footballers from Chongqing
Chongqing Liangjiang Athletic F.C. players
Dalian Professional F.C. players
Beijing Guoan F.C. players
Guizhou F.C. players
Chinese Super League players
China League One players

Association football defenders